This Week is the second studio album by rapper Jean Grae. It was released on September 21, 2004, via Babygrande Records.

Track listing

Charts

References

2004 albums
Jean Grae albums
Babygrande Records albums
Albums produced by 9th Wonder
Albums produced by Midi Mafia